Jannes Hoffmann (born 10 March 1996) is a German footballer who plays as a midfielder for 1. FC Kaan-Marienborn.

References

External links
 
 

1996 births
Living people
People from Oberbergischer Kreis
Sportspeople from Cologne (region)
German footballers
Footballers from North Rhine-Westphalia
Association football midfielders
Germany youth international footballers
1. FC Köln II players
1. FC Nürnberg II players
SG Sonnenhof Großaspach players
SC Fortuna Köln players
1. FC Kaan-Marienborn players
3. Liga players
Regionalliga players